Luca Guastini  (born March 9, 1982 in Livorno, Italy) is an Italian actor.

Biography 
Guastini was born in Livorno, Italy, the son of a housewife and an office worker. He has one brother.

He began playing piano when he was 5, with the hope of becoming a musician. Guastini played in various garage bands.

Acting accidentally stepped into his life. After a few performances as a busker he will work with directors such as Serge Denoncourt, Michelangelo Ricci, Gabriele Paoli.

Guastini's first major role was in the 2010 film Exit: una storia personale, directed by Max Amato, for which he won the Prix d'Interprétation Masculine - Festival du Cinema Italien d'Annecy (2010).

In 2011, he starred in Steel, based on the Silvia Avallone novel of the same name, directed by Stefano Mordini and presented at the Venice Film Festival (2012).

In 2015, he starred in the comedy L'Universale, directed by Federico Micali and L'ospite, a biographical drama film based on the last days of the philosopher Giovanni Gentile , directed by Ugo Frosi .

Filmography

Film

Television

References

External links 

 

Italian male film actors
1982 births
Living people